The Great Lakes Football Conference (GLFC) began operations in the 2006 season, with six institutions competing.  After the 2011 season the remaining institutions moved into the Great Lakes Valley Conference.  A previous incarnation of the conference was disbanded after the 1999 season.

Former members
Central State University left the GLFC before the 2010 season to become an independent in football.
Kentucky Wesleyan College
Lincoln University left the GLFC to re-join the MIAA in 2010, the school's football team played as a member of the GLFC, and in the Heartland Conference in all other sports.
Missouri University of Science and Technology
Saint Joseph's College
Tiffin University left the GLFC to join the Great Lakes Intercollegiate Athletic Conference beginning in the fall of 2008 for every sport.  The school used to play as a dual member of the NCAA Division II and NAIA in all sports except football.
Urbana University joined GLVC football in 2012, playing as a single-sport affiliate while housing most of its other sports in the Great Midwest Athletic Conference, but left after only one year to become a charter member of the Mountain East Conference in 2013. It remained a Mountain East member until it permanently closed in 2020.

Fate
The Great Lakes Valley Conference began sponsoring football in the fall of 2012.  This plan was announced shortly after William Jewell College was admitted to the league, giving the GLVC 16 members and 6 football playing members including William Jewell, Quincy University, University of Indianapolis, and Great Lakes Football Conference members Kentucky Wesleyan College, Missouri University of Science and Technology, and Saint Joseph's College.  Later in 2010, McKendree University was admitted into the GLVC as the league's 17th member and 7th football playing member.  On October 7, 2010, it was announced that the GLVC had accepted Central State University and Urbana University as associate members in football beginning with the 2012 season.   This meant that the Great Lakes Football Conference was effectively absorbed by the Great Lakes Valley Conference in 2012.

Conference champions

References

Defunct NCAA Division II conferences
Great Lakes Valley Conference football